Mountain Springs Summit [el. ] is a mountain pass in the Spring Mountains of Southern Nevada in the United States.

The pass is on the summit of a ridge in the Spring Mountains between the Mount Charleston area and the rest of the Mojave Desert and is located on the border of the Humboldt-Toiyabe National Forest and Red Rock Canyon National Conservation Area. The pass connects the Pahrump Valley with the Las Vegas Valley, and it is traversed by State Route 160.

History 
The Old Spanish National Historic Trail went through the pass and along the center-south of Pahrump Valley on a route from southwest Las Vegas.

Mountain passes of Nevada
Landforms of Clark County, Nevada
Old Spanish Trail (trade route)